Traffic lights are signalling devices positioned at road intersections, pedestrian crossings, and other locations to control flows of traffic. Traffic lights were first introduced in December 1868 on Parliament Square in London to reduce the need for police offers to control traffic. Since then, electricity and computerised control has advanced traffic light technology and increased intersection capacity.

The origins of traffic signals 
Before traffic lights, traffic police controlled the flow of traffic. A well-documented example is that on London Bridge in 1722. Three men were given the task of directing traffic coming in and out of either London or Southwark.  Each officer would help direct traffic coming out of Southwark into London and he made sure all traffic stayed on the west side of the bridge.  A second officer would direct traffic on the east side of the bridge to control the flow of people leaving London and going into Southwark.

On 9 December 1868, the first non-electric gas-lit traffic lights were installed outside the Houses of Parliament in London to control the traffic in Bridge Street, Great George Street, and Parliament Street. They were proposed by the railway engineer J. P. Knight of Nottingham who had adapted this idea from his design of railway signalling systems and constructed by the railway signal engineers of Saxby & Farmer. The main reason for the traffic light was that there was an overflow of horse-drawn traffic over Westminster Bridge which forced thousands of pedestrians to walk next to the Houses of Parliament. The design combined three semaphore arms with red and green gas lamps for night-time use, on a pillar, operated by a police constable. The gas lantern was manually turned by a traffic police officer with a lever at its base so that the appropriate light faced traffic. The light was called the semaphore and had arms that would extend horizontally that commanded drivers to "Stop" and then the arms would lower to a 45 degrees angle to tell drivers to proceed with "Caution". At night a red light would command "Stop" and a green light would mean use "Caution". Although it was said to be successful at controlling traffic, its operational life was brief. It exploded on 2 January 1869 as a result of a leak in one of the gas lines underneath the pavement and injured the policeman who was operating it.

Pre-electric signals 

In the first two decades of the 20th century, semaphore traffic signals like the one in London were in use all over the United States with each state having its own design of the device. One example was from Toledo, Ohio in 1908. It was controlled by a traffic officer who would blow a whistle before changing the commands on this signal to help alert travellers of the change. The design was also used in Philadelphia and Detroit. The example in Ohio was the first time America tried to use a more visible form of traffic control that involved the use of semaphores. The device that was used in Ohio was designed based on the use of railroad signals.

In 1912, a traffic control device was placed on top of a tower in Paris at the intersection of rue Montmartre and the boulevard Montmartre.  This tower signal was operated by a policewoman and she used a revolving four-sided metal box on top of a glass showcase where the word "Stop" was painted in red and the word "Go" painted in white.

Electric signals 
In 1912, the first electric traffic light was developed in 1912 by Lester Wire, a policeman in Salt Lake City, Utah. It was installed by the American Traffic Signal Company on the corner of East 105th Street and Euclid Avenue in Cleveland, Ohio. It had two colours, red and green, and a buzzer, based on the design of James Hoge, to provide a warning for colour changes. The design by James Hoge allowed police and fire stations to control the signals in case of emergency. The first interconnected traffic signal system was installed in Salt Lake City in 1917, with six connected intersections controlled simultaneously from a manual switch.

The first four-way, three-colour traffic light was created by police officer William Potts in Detroit, Michigan in 1920. He was concerned about how police officers at four different lights signals could not change their lights all at the same time.  The answer was a third light that was coloured amber, which was the same colour used on the railroad. Potts also placed a timer with the light to help coordinate the lights. A tower was used to mount the lights as the junction at which it was installed was one of the busiest in the world, with over 20,000 vehicles a day.

Los Angeles installed its first automated traffic signals in October 1920 at five locations on Broadway. These early signals, manufactured by the Acme Traffic Signal Co., paired "Stop" and "Go" semaphore arms with small red and green lights. Bells played the role of today's amber lights, ringing when the flags changed—a process that took five seconds. By 1923 the city had installed 31 Acme traffic control devices.

In 1922 traffic towers were beginning to be controlled by automatic timers.  The first company to add timers in traffic lights was Crouse Hinds.  They built railroad signals and were the first company to place timers in traffic lights in Houston, which was their home city. The main advantage for the use of the timer was that it saved cities money by replacing traffic officers. The city of New York was able to reassign all but 500 of its 6,000 officers working on the traffic squad; this saved the city $12,500,000. Wolverhampton was the first British town to introduce automated traffic lights in 1927 in Princes Square at the junction of Lichfield Street and Princess Street.

After witnessing an accident between an automobile and a horse-drawn carriage, inventor Garrett Morgan filed a U.S. patent for a traffic signal. Patent No. 1,475,024 was granted on 20 November 1923 for Morgan's three-position traffic signal.

The twelve-light system did not become available until 1928 and another feature of the light system was that hoods were placed over the light and each lens was sand-blasted to increase daytime visibility. Both the tower and semaphores were phased out by 1930.  Towers were too big and obstructed traffic; semaphores were too small and drivers could not see them at night.

Ashville, Ohio, claims to be the home of the oldest working traffic light in the world, used at an intersection of public roads from 1932 to 1982 when it was moved to a local museum. Guinness World Records backed this claim by naming it the Oldest functional traffic light.

In 1949, the first traffic light in the continent of Asia was installed in Haifa, Israel. The first traffic light in South India was installed at Egmore Junction, Chennai in 1953. The city of Bangalore installed its first traffic light at Corporation Circle in 1963.

Computerised signals 
The control of traffic lights made a big turn with the rise of computers in America in the 1950s. Thanks to computers, the changing of lights made traffic flow even better thanks to computerised detection.  A pressure plate was placed at intersections so that computers would know that a car was waiting at the red light. Some of this detection included knowing the number of waiting cars against the red light and the length of time waited by the first vehicle at the red. One of the best historical examples of computerized control of lights was in Denver in 1952.  One computer took control of 120 lights with six pressure-sensitive detectors measuring inbound and outbound traffic. The control room that housed the computer in charge of the system was in the basement of the City and County Building. As computers started to evolve, traffic light control also improved and became easier.  In 1967, the city of Toronto was the first to use more advanced computers that were better at vehicle detection. The computers maintained control over 159 signals in the cities through telephone lines.

Countdown timers on traffic lights were introduced in the 1990s. Timers are useful for pedestrians, to plan whether there is enough time to cross the intersection before the end of the walk phase, and for drivers, to know the amount of time before the light switches. In the United States, timers for vehicle traffic are prohibited, but pedestrian timers are now required on new or upgraded signals on wider roadways. Some pedestrian timers can be used by motorists as well to know how much time remains in the green cycle, because often when the pedestrian timer reaches zero, the signal will simultaneously turn amber.

References 

Road traffic management
Traffic signals
Traffic management